Shree Navatandham (Nepali: श्री नवतनधाम) is one of the holy shrines of Pranami Sampradaya in Nepal.

Typonomy 
The temple  was named after 'Shree 5 Navatanpuri Dham', the main shrine of Pranami Sampradaya.
'

References

Hindu temples in Kathmandu District
Buildings and structures in Kathmandu